Łukasz Cieślewicz (born 15 November 1987, in Gniezno) is a Polish footballer, who plays as a forward for Víkingur Gøta in the Faroe Islands Premier League. Prior to that he was at Danish clubs Brøndby, and Hvidovre. Cieślewicz has won the Faroe Islands Premier League three times, and he has been named its best player twice.

Club career
Cieślewicz started his football with local club Mieszko Gniezno. He moved to the Faroe Islands when he was 12, when his father moved to the country to play for ÍF Fuglafjørður. Cieślewicz would play in the Faroes with VB Vágur. In 2003, aged 16, he moved from Vágur to Denmark to play for Brøndby. In Brøndby he played with the club's reserve team in the Danish 2nd Division, becoming a fan favorite. Failing to make any first team appearances for Brøndby, Cieślewicz was loaned out to Hvidovre in the Danish 1st Division. Following a string of good performances which helped Hvidovre avoid relegation, he made a permanent move to the club signing a two-year contract in July 2008. In the summer of 2010 Cieślewicz was on trial in Lyngby, and after failing to secure a permanent deal with them, he signed a half-year contract with Hvidovre.

In January 2011 Cieślewicz signed a contract with B36 Tórshavn of the Faroe Islands Premier League. In June 2011 he scored a hat-trick, as B36 won 4–1 against KÍ Klaksvík. Cieślewicz also scored the winning goal against EB/Streymur, to help B36 secure its ninth league title, with one match left in the league. At the end of the season he was named Player of the Year in the league, after appearing in all 27 games and scoring 17 goals. In November 2012 he went on trial to Warta Poznań, but in January 2013 he returned to B36. In January 2013 he joined Polish Ekstraklasa side Ruch Chorzów on trial, but, although he scored two goals in the two friendly matches he was used, he was not offered a contract by Ruch's manager Jacek Zieliński. With two games left in the 2014 season, Cieślewicz helped his team secure its tenth title as he provided the assist for teammate Adeshina Lawal to equalise on the way to B36's 3–1 win over B68 Toftir. In July 2015 Cieślewicz played against his brother, Adrian Cieślewicz, for the first time in his life in the first qualifying round of the Champions League. The brothers appeared in both games, and Łukasz scored in the second leg, but B36 was eventually eliminated by The New Saints. Łukasz was named Midfielder of the Year and Player of the Year at the end of the 2015 season.

Personal
Cieślewicz was born in 1987 in Gniezno, Poland to Polish professional football player Robert Cieślewicz. Łukasz's brother, Adrian, is also a professional football player, playing for The New Saints. The two of them were teammates in 2014, as they played for B36. Łukasz has described himself as a non-practicing Catholic.

Honours

Club
B36 Tórshavn
 Faroe Islands Premier League: 2011, 2014, 2015

Individual
 Faroe Islands Player of the Year: 2011, 2015

References

External links
 Łukasz Cieślewicz at FaroeSoccer.com
 

1987 births
Living people
Polish footballers
Polish expatriate footballers
B36 Tórshavn players
Hvidovre IF players
Brøndby IF players
VB Vágur players
Víkingur Gøta players
Danish 1st Division players
Association football forwards
People from Gniezno
Sportspeople from Greater Poland Voivodeship
Polish expatriate sportspeople in Denmark
Polish expatriate sportspeople in the Faroe Islands
Expatriate men's footballers in Denmark
Expatriate footballers in the Faroe Islands